Ameridose, LLC. is a medical manufacturer based in Westborough, Massachusetts. The company was founded, along with its sister company New England Compounding Center, by brothers-in-law Greg Conigliaro and Barry Cadden. The owners of Ameridose are Carla R. Conigliaro, Barry J. Cadden, Lisa M. Conigliaro and Gregory A. Conigliaro.

History
Brothers-in-law Greg Conigliaro and Barry Cadden established Ameridose to be a large manufacturer of prescription medications for use in hospitals. The original location of the company's plant was in Framingham, Massachusetts next to its sister-companies New England Compounding Center and Medical Sales Management. In 2009, they started operations at a new location, 205 Flanders Road in nearby Westborough, to accommodate the steady growth of the company.

Controversy

Ameridose's sister-company, New England Compounding Center (NECC), was implicated as the source of a nationwide fungal meningitis outbreak of 2012. It was found that tainted batches of the steroid methylprednisolone acetate caused hundreds of cases of fungal meningitis. Sixty-four deaths have been attributed to the tainted steroids. 

Although Ameridose was not the source of the outbreak, the company was largely impacted by its affiliation with NECC. Due to pressure from the state and the U.S. Food and Drug Administration (FDA) because of growing concern of their association with NECC, the company recalled all of its products and shut down operations in October 2012. In early November that year, Ameridose laid off 650 employees working in its Westborough facilities. 

The FDA began investigating Ameridose's facilities in October 2012. There were fifteen concerning observations that they made during the investigations. These include the following: 
 A bird was observed flying around inside the building in an area where finished drugs are stored
 Insects were found in an area where finished drugs are stored
 Gaps were observed underneath doors and "pass-through boxes"
 Thick residues of orange, brown, and green were observed in several hoods where drugs are made
 Drugs were shipped out before sterility tests were complete
 Ameridose failed to investigate complaints made by customers about its products  

On October 12, 2012, The New York Times published an article in which they interviewed employees from both NECC and Ameridose. Some stated that the company was run well and seemed safe. Several others voiced their concerns with the companies. Many employees interviewed believed that Ameridose emphasized quantity and speed instead of quality and safety. The article also stated that in 2008 an inspector from the FDA found that the firm did not use adequate potency testing on their products.           

In December 2012, WFXT reporter Mike Beaudet interviewed a former Ameridose employee. She said employees would often see bugs and birds inside the company's buildings. She also claimed that she witnessed company supervisors attempting to cover up their tracks for taking shortcuts when they learned that the FDA was going to inspect their facilities.

References

Pharmaceutical companies of the United States
Health care companies based in Massachusetts